George Washington Building, also known as the Virginia State Office Building, is a historic state office building located in Richmond, Virginia.  It was built in 1922–1923, and is a 12-story, steel frame, "V"-shaped Beaux-Arts style building. The building has a one-story basement, two-story limestone base, nine-story brick shaft, and attic story with a deep cornice that features elaborate terra cotta ornament.

It was listed on the National Register of Historic Places in 2011.

References

Government buildings on the National Register of Historic Places in Virginia
Beaux-Arts architecture in Virginia
Government buildings completed in 1923
Buildings and structures in Richmond, Virginia
National Register of Historic Places in Richmond, Virginia